Daniel Esposito (born 25 November 1963) is an Australian modern pentathlete. He competed at the modern pentathlon event 1984 Summer Olympics. Shortly before the Summer Olympics in Seoul in 1988, he was injured and then didn't compete.

He is the father and coach of Chloe Esposito, who won gold in the women's modern pentathlon at the 2016 Summer Olympics, and Max Esposito, who finished seventh in the men's modern pentathlon at the 2016 Summer Olympics. His daughter Emily is an air pistol shooter.

References

External links
 

1963 births
Living people
Australian male modern pentathletes
Olympic modern pentathletes of Australia
Modern pentathletes at the 1984 Summer Olympics